The University of Nevada, Reno School of Medicine is an academic division of the University of Nevada, Reno and grants the Doctor of Medicine (MD) degree. The School of Medicine was founded on March 25, 1969, as the first medical school in the state of Nevada. More than 1,500 MDs have graduated from the School of Medicine. The pre-clinical campus is located in Reno, but the third and fourth years can be spent in hospitals and clinics throughout Nevada. Residencies associated with the School of Medicine are located in Reno. Students may earn the MD-MPH, MD-MBA or MD–PhD degrees as well.

Affiliated hospitals
The School of Medicine has affiliations with many hospitals from Nevada, Arizona and other states, including the following.
 Banner Churchill Community Hospital (Fallon)
 Battle Mountain General Hospital (Battle Mountain)
 Carson Tahoe Regional Medical Center (Carson City)
 Carson Valley Medical Center (Gardnerville)
 Desert View Hospital (Pahrump)
 Golden Valley Medical Center (Winnemucca)
 Humboldt General Hospital (Winnemucca)
 Incline Village Community Hospital (Incline Village)
 Mount Grant General Hospital (Hawthorne)
 Northeastern Nevada Regional Hospital (Elko)
 Northern Nevada Medical Center (Sparks)
 Pershing General Hospital (Lovelock)
 Renown Regional Medical Center (Reno)
 Renown South Meadows Medical Center (Reno)
 Saint Mary's Regional Medical Center (Reno)
 South Lyon Medical Center (Yerington)
 VA Sierra Nevada Health (Reno)
 William Bee Ririe Critical Access Hospital (Ely)

Graduate medical education
The residencies and fellowships associated with the University of Nevada, Reno School of Medicine, as of July 1, 2017.

Residencies

Fellowships

Library
The Savitt Medical Library is the academic medical library for the University of Nevada, Reno School of Medicine.[1] The library was founded in July 1978, after the medical school converted to a four-year, degree-granting program. It was named for Sol and Ella Savitt after their gift made support for the library and its collection possible. Previously it was known as the Life and Health Sciences Library and was housed in the Max C. Fleischmann College of Agriculture in 1958.[2]

Student Outreach Clinic 
One of the unique aspects of the University of Nevada, Reno School of Medicine is that it has a student run clinic on campus that aims to serve uninsured or underinsured members in the Reno area community. The clinic offers a variety of basic medical care services such as flu shots, pap smears, blood pressure monitoring, and physicals, among others. This establishment is great practice for the future doctors of Nevada to get hands-on experience under the supervision of a licensed physician as well as an opportunity for those who may not have access to health care to be taken care of.

References

External links
 

1969 establishments in Nevada
Educational institutions established in 1969
Medical schools in Nevada
University of Nevada, Reno